Badi may refer to:

People
Badi II, (1645–1681) ruler of the Kingdom of Sennar
Badi III, (1692–1716) ruler of the Kingdom of Sennar
Badi IV, (1724–1762) ruler of the Kingdom of Sennar
Badí‘ (Mírzá Áqá Buzurg-i-Nishapuri), (1852–1869) an early Bahá'í martyr from Persia
Badi people, Nepal
Badi (caste) a scheduled caste found in Uttar Pradesh
Chimène Badi (born 1982), French singer

Places
Badi, Dholpur, an administrative subdivision of Dholpur district, Western India
Badi, Guinea
Badi, Iran, a village in Khuzestan Province, Iran
Badi, Nauru, a city in the Republic of Nauru
Badi, Raisen, a town in Madhya Pradesh, India
Badi, Sudan, a medieval city on the west coast of the Red Sea
El Badi Palace, a Moroccan palace built in 1578

Others
Al-Badīʿ, one of the names of God in Islam
Badi' calendar, used in Bábism and the Bahá'í Faith
 , a 1984 Turkish film
Badi language, a language of Northwestern Iran
Badi (magazine), a Japanese magazine for gay men
Badi Mata, one of the Hindu mahavidyas
 Badi Panthulu, a 1972 Telugu film
Badi' poetry

See also 
Badi' al-Zaman (disambiguation), multiple people
Badis (disambiguation)

Arabic masculine given names